The  was an infantry division of the Imperial Japanese Army. Its call sign was the 

The IJA 22nd Army was a short-lived component of the Southern China Area Army from February to November 1940 during the Second Sino-Japanese War. After the dissolution of the IJA 22nd Army on 30 November 1940 it was elevated to division status under the IJA 23rd Army and in August 1941 was transferred to Taipei in Taiwan.

The  division was composed of the 27th Independent Mixed Brigade (Taiwan Mixed Brigade) and the 47th Infantry Regiment which became available when the IJA 6th Division transitioned from a rectangular to a triangular division. The 48th Division was initially part of the Taiwan Army, before being reassigned to the IJA 14th Army on 12 August 1941. In preparation for the Pacific War, the division was mechanized (along with the IJA 5th Division, which was completed 6 November 1941.

Under the command of Lieutenant General Yuitsu Tsuchihashi, the IJA 48th Division was among the first Japanese forces to land in the Philippines as part of the IJA 14th Army, and captured Manila, but did not participate in the Battle of Bataan.  Instead, in January 1942 the division was transferred to the control of the IJA 16th Army in eastern Java, where it was assigned the capture of Surabaya and its strategic oil fields on 7 March 1942. 

Afterwards, the IJA 48th Division was assigned to garrison of the island of Timor as part of the IJA 19th Army. Although the island had been captured by Japan in the Battle of Timor, much of the island was still in the hands of Australian and Dutch commandos. Tsuchihashi launched a major counter-offensive in an attempt to push the Australians into a corner on the south coast of the island. The Japanese also recruited significant numbers of Timorese civilians, who provided intelligence on Allied movements. The island was secured when the remaining Australian commandos were evacuated in December 1942.

The IJA 19th Army was abolished on 28 February 1945, and the division became subordinate to the IJA 16th Army.

The IJA 48th Division remained as a garrison force on Timor until the surrender of Japan.

See also
 List of Japanese Infantry Divisions

Reference and further reading

 Madej, W. Victor. Japanese Armed Forces Order of Battle, 1937-1945 [2 vols] Allentown, PA: 1981

Japanese World War II divisions
Infantry divisions of Japan
Military units and formations established in 1940
Military units and formations disestablished in 1945
1940 establishments in Japan
1945 disestablishments in Japan